Gangal is a village in the Sohawa tehsil of Jhelum District, Punjab, Pakistan.

|

Villages in Jhelum District
Populated places in Tehsil Sohawa